Victor Polidori (20 March 1888 – 24 August 1931) was a French gymnast. He competed in the men's team event at the 1908 Summer Olympics.

References

External links
 

1888 births
1931 deaths
French male artistic gymnasts
Olympic gymnasts of France
Gymnasts at the 1908 Summer Olympics
Sportspeople from Nord (French department)
20th-century French people